Karagedik is a neighborhood of the District of Gölbaşı, Ankara Province, Turkey. The village is populated by Kurds.

References

Populated places in Ankara Province
Neighbourhoods of Gölbaşı, Ankara

Kurdish settlements in Ankara Province